Caroline Mary Brown (9 July 1953 – 5 February 2018) was an English cellist who was known for forming the Hanover Band in 1980 that aimed to play music of the Hanoverian era exactly as it originally sounded with the correct instruments and original scores.

References 

1953 births
2018 deaths
English cellists
Deaths from ovarian cancer
Place of birth missing
Place of death missing
Women cellists